Lesmoir Castle was a 16th-century castle, about  west of Rhynie, Aberdeenshire, Scotland, south-west of Tap o' Noth, at Mains of Lesmoir.

History
Jock o’Scurdargue used the castle in the 15th century.  Although it has been suggested that there was construction dating back to 1508 while the earliest evidence suggests 1544.  It is said to have been repaired around 1600.  It became a Gordon stronghold in the 16th century.  David Leslie captured it in 1647 by draining the wet moat; he sacked the castle and hanged 27 of the garrison.
The Grants of Rothiemaise purchased it in 1759, and dismantled it.

Structure
The castle was in 13th-century circular earthworks.  There are few remains of the castle.
In 1647 there was a tower with a walled courtyard, which enclosed outbuildings. There was a moat. A house here remained until 1759 when it was demolished for building materials. There was a motte.

See also
Castles in Great Britain and Ireland
List of castles in Scotland

References

Castles in Aberdeenshire